Papyrus 41 (in the Gregory-Aland numbering), designated by 𝔓41, is an early copy of the New Testament in Greek and Coptic. It is a diglot, it is a papyrus manuscript of the Acts of the Apostles. The manuscript paleographically has been assigned to the 8th century.

Description 
 Contents 
The Greek text of the papyrus contains: 
Acts 17:28-18:2.17-18.22-25.27; 19:1-4.6-8.13-16.18-19; 20:9-13.15-16.22-24.26-38; 21:3.4.26-27; 22:11-14.16-17. 

The Coptic text of the papyrus contains: Acts 17:30-18:2.25.27-28; 19:2-8.15.17-19; 20:11-16.24-28; 20:36-21:3; 22:12-14.16-17. 

 Text-type 
The Greek text of this codex is a representative of the Western text-type. Aland placed it in Category III.

 Textual variants 
In Acts 21:1 it reads Παταρα και Μυρα for Παταρα, the reading is supported by Dgr gig (itph Hyram) vgmss copsa;

 Location 
It is currently housed at the Österreichische Nationalbibliothek (Pap. G. 17973, 26133, 35831, 39783) in Vienna.

See also 
 List of New Testament papyri
 Coptic versions of the Bible

References

Further reading  
 C. Wessely, Studien zur Paläographie und Papyruskunde XV, (Leipzig 1914), pp. 107–118. 
 F.-J. Schmitz, Neue Fragmente zum P41, (Münster 1988), pp. 78–97. 

New Testament papyri 
Greek-Coptic diglot manuscripts of the New Testament 
8th-century biblical manuscripts
Biblical manuscripts of the Austrian National Library
Acts of the Apostles papyri